Dinis is a Portuguese masculine given name, a cognate of Dennis. Notable people with the name include:

Dinis, Prince of Portugal (1354–1397), Portuguese infante
Dinis Dias (15th century), Portuguese explorer
Dinis of Portugal (1261–1325), the sixth King of Portugal and the Algarve
Dinis of Portugal (1481–1516), the younger son of Fernando II, Duke of Braganza and Isabella of Viseu
Dinis Sengulane (21st century), Mozambican Anglican bishop
Dinis Vital (born 1932), Portuguese footballer

Portuguese masculine given names